The Central constituency (No.136) is a Russian legislative constituency in Novosibirsk Oblast. The constituency was created in 2015 from parts of Novosibirsk, which was taken from urban Zayeltsovsky and Zavodskoy constituencies, and eastern Novosibirsk Oblast from Iskitim constituency.

Members elected

Election results

2016

|-
! colspan=2 style="background-color:#E9E9E9;text-align:left;vertical-align:top;" |Candidate
! style="background-color:#E9E9E9;text-align:left;vertical-align:top;" |Party
! style="background-color:#E9E9E9;text-align:right;" |Votes
! style="background-color:#E9E9E9;text-align:right;" |%
|-
|style="background-color: " |
|align=left|Maksim Kudryavtsev
|align=left|United Russia
|
|36.15%
|-
|style="background-color:"|
|align=left|Dmitry Savelyev
|align=left|Liberal Democratic Party
|
|21.19%
|-
|style="background-color:"|
|align=left|Renat Suleymanov
|align=left|Communist Party
|
|17.96%
|-
|style="background:"| 
|align=left|Sergey Loskutov
|align=left|Communists of Russia
|
|5.87%
|-
|style="background-color:"|
|align=left|Pavel Pyatnitsky
|align=left|Rodina
|
|3.88%
|-
|style="background-color:"|
|align=left|Olga Vakulenko
|align=left|The Greens
|
|3.67%
|-
|style="background-color:"|
|align=left|Gennady Shishebarov
|align=left|Yabloko
|
|2.82%
|-
|style="background:"| 
|align=left|Sergey Dyachkov
|align=left|People's Freedom Party
|
|2.03%
|-
|style="background:"| 
|align=left|Vadim Skurikhin
|align=left|Patriots of Russia
|
|1.07%
|-
| colspan="5" style="background-color:#E9E9E9;"|
|- style="font-weight:bold"
| colspan="3" style="text-align:left;" | Total
| 
| 100%
|-
| colspan="5" style="background-color:#E9E9E9;"|
|- style="font-weight:bold"
| colspan="4" |Source:
|
|}

2021

|-
! colspan=2 style="background-color:#E9E9E9;text-align:left;vertical-align:top;" |Candidate
! style="background-color:#E9E9E9;text-align:left;vertical-align:top;" |Party
! style="background-color:#E9E9E9;text-align:right;" |Votes
! style="background-color:#E9E9E9;text-align:right;" |%
|-
|style="background-color:"|
|align=left|Dmitry Savelyev
|align=left|United Russia
|
|40.71%
|-
|style="background-color:"|
|align=left|Renat Suleymanov
|align=left|Communist Party
|
|19.82%
|-
|style="background:"| 
|align=left|Aleksandr Lipatkin
|align=left|Communists of Russia
|
|7.75%
|-
|style="background-color: " |
|align=left|Vyacheslav Usoltsev
|align=left|New People
|
|7.67%
|-
|style="background-color:"|
|align=left|Aleksandr Prokhorov
|align=left|A Just Russia — For Truth
|
|6.15%
|-
|style="background-color:"|
|align=left|Aleksandr Shcherbak
|align=left|Liberal Democratic Party
|
|5.91%
|-
|style="background-color: "|
|align=left|Natalya Chubartseva
|align=left|Party of Pensioners
|
|3.72%
|-
|style="background: "| 
|align=left|Tatyana Kharkovskaya
|align=left|Russian Party of Freedom and Justice
|
|1.70%
|-
|style="background:"| 
|align=left|Oleg Shestakov
|align=left|Party of Growth
|
|1.41%
|-
|style="background: "| 
|align=left|Dmitry Shabanov
|align=left|Yabloko
|
|1.31%
|-
| colspan="5" style="background-color:#E9E9E9;"|
|- style="font-weight:bold"
| colspan="3" style="text-align:left;" | Total
| 
| 100%
|-
| colspan="5" style="background-color:#E9E9E9;"|
|- style="font-weight:bold"
| colspan="4" |Source:
|
|}

References

Russian legislative constituencies
Politics of Novosibirsk Oblast